The Sierra Leone Selection Trust was formed in 1934 following an agreement between the government of British Sierra Leone and the Consolidated African Selection Trust Ltd (CAST). CAST was formed in 1924 and was part of a much larger mining finance house Selection Trust Ltd which had been founded in 1913 by Alfred Chester Beatty (an American mining magnate). Although the Oppenheimers (De Beers) invested in CAST and its subsidiaries from the 1920s and had boardroom representation, CAST was independent of the Oppenheimer empire. SLST corporation which had exclusive mineral mining rights in Sierra Leone beginning in 1935 was scheduled to last for 99 years. In 1955, the SLST abandoned mineral mining and settled on mining the Yengema and Tongo Fields. However, with the creation of the Sierra Leonean parastatal National Diamond Mining Company in 1971, the diamond company was effectively nationalized, ending the SLST in Sierra Leone.

Sources
 Peter Greenhlagh - West African Diamonds - An economic history 1919-83. 
 The Heart of the Matter: Sierra Leone, Diamonds & Human Security

External links
 Catalogue of the Selection Trust papers at the Archives Division of the London School of Economics.
 

SLST
SLST
SLST
1934 establishments in Sierra Leone
Non-renewable resource companies established in 1934
Non-renewable resource companies disestablished in 1989
Financial services companies disestablished in 1989
Diamond mining companies of Sierra Leone